Elisavet (or Elisabet or Elsi) Spathari is a Greek archaeologist and author. She is Honorary Director Emeritus of Ministry of Culture in Greece and has written several books about Ancient Greece.

In 2002, Spathari helped the Nemea Valley Archaeological Project, sponsored by Bryn Mawr College, an archeological survey and excavation of Tsoungiza on Peloponnese.

Works 
 Olympic Spirit, 1992
 Αρμενίζοντας στο χρόνο – Sailing Through Time: The Ship in Greek Art (translated to English), 1995
 Ο Ζαχαρίας και ο κόσμος, 1999
 Ναύπλιο, Παλαμήδι, 2000
 Αρχαία ελληνικά θέατρα, 2000
 Το ολυμπιακό πνεύμα, 2001
 Μυκήνες, 2001
 Ευ αγωνίζεσθαι, 2004
 Αχιλλέας Κομίνος, ο μεγάλος περίπατος, 2005
 Κόρινθος, Μυκήνες, Τύρινθα, Επίδαυρος – Corinth, Mycenae, Tiryns, Epidauros (translated to English, French, Spanish, Portuguese, Italian, German and Russian), 2008
 Ελληνική μυθολογία – Greek Mythology (translated to English, German, French, Italian, Spanish and Russian), 2010 and reprint 2012
 Ναύπλιο Πρωτεύουσα Πόλη – Nafplio Capital City (translated to English), 2020

Collective works 
 Αρχαία Ολυμπία – Olympie antique (translated to French), 2004
 Αθήνα – Σπάρτη, 2007
 Δημοκρατία και η μάχη του Μαραθώνα – Democracy and the Battle of Marathon (translated to English), 2010
 Αρχαιολογία: Πελοπόννησος, 2012

References 

Living people
20th-century Greek women writers
21st-century Greek women writers
Greek archaeologists
Year of birth missing (living people)
Greek women archaeologists